Čierne nad Topľou is a village and municipality in Vranov nad Topľou District in the Prešov Region of eastern Slovakia.

History
In historical records the village was first mentioned in 1399.

Geography
The municipality lies at an altitude of 150 metres and covers an area of 8.339 km2.

Population
According to the 2011 census, the municipality had 757 inhabitants. 742 of inhabitants were Slovaks and 15 others and unspecified.

See also
 List of municipalities and towns in Slovakia

References

Genealogical resources
The records for genealogical research are available at the state archive "Statny Archiv in Presov, Slovakia"
 Roman Catholic church records (births/marriages/deaths): 1818-1898 (parish B)
 Greek Catholic church records (births/marriages/deaths): 1807-1951 (parish B)
 Lutheran church records (births/marriages/deaths): 1810-1896 (parish B)

External links
 
 
http://www.statistics.sk/mosmis/eng/run.html
Surnames of living people in Cierne nad Toplou

Villages and municipalities in Vranov nad Topľou District